This is a list of public art in the London Borough of Hackney.

Dalston

Hackney Central

Hackney Downs

Hackney Marshes

Hackney Wick

Haggerston

Homerton

Hoxton

Lea Bridge

London Fields

Shoreditch

South Hackney

Stoke Newington

See also
 The Towers of Hackney (1970s – 2009)

References

Bibliography

External links
 

Hackney
Hackney
Tourist attractions in the London Borough of Hackney